Global Underground 020: Darren Emerson, Singapore is a DJ mix album in the Global Underground series, compiled and mixed by Darren Emerson. The Mix is a retrospective look at a New Year's Eve set at the Zouk club in Singapore.

Emerson returns to GU, having become a prolific globetrotter in his post-Underworld era. Here he chooses to represent the exciting nightlife of Singapore, based around the legendary Zouk nightclub. The venue had carefully established itself as the leading destination for the world's top DJs in Asia, single-handedly turning the dynamic city-state into a firm favourite on the global clubbing circuit.

The mix was inspired by Darren's appearance at the club on New Year's Eve 2000, and as such has a definite party feel to it. The style is also less heavily techno influenced as his previous GU mix, with the more housey sounds found on his rising Underwater label coming through.

Track listing

Disc one
 Remote Control - "Bruno" – 1:09
 Ramirez - "Hablando" – 5:45
 Boy Versus Girl - "Boom! (Peace Division's Boomin' Dub)" – 4:59
 Medicine - "Junior Aspirin" – 3:22
 Orlando Careca vs The Cosmonut - "I'm a Sexmachine" – 4:14
 A2 - "Do you like the way You feel when You Shake? (Mix 2)" – 6:07
 Hatiras - "Spaced Invader (Underwater Remix)" – 5:31
 Jose Nunez - "Harmonizer" – 3:29
 Jeremy Sylvester  - "B-Bop" – 3:22
 Medicine - "Universal Personal" – 3:44
 Nitzer Ebb vs Thomas P Heckmann - "Join in the Chant (Knarz is Machine)" – 3:48
 Thee Cat in Da Hat - "Thee Rush" – 5:19
 Circulation - "Purple" – 3:12
 Ubu - "Pixels" – 6:14
 Remote Control - "Bruno (16B Arrangement Edit)" – 6:04

Disc two
 Shyman & DJ LJK - "Make Me Do Right" – 5:11
 Inland Knights featuring To-Ka Project - "Back Again" – 2:53
 The Unlikely Lads - "Two of a Kind" – 3:22
 Circulation - "Magenta" – 7:15
 George T - "Interactive Night" – 4:07
 Jori Hulkkonen - "Man from Solaris" – 6:18
 Slam featuring Tyrone - "Lifetimes" – 7:45
 Sandy Rivera featuring LT Brown - "Come Into My Room" – 5:34
 Juan Recoba - "Alpha" – 4:20
 DJ Sneak - "Wickedy Sound" – 5:33
 Soul'Amour - "Alegria (Phearce Barbarela Mix)" – 4:24
 KC Flightt vs. Funky Junction - "Voices (Peter Heller Main Mix)" – 6:03
 Laurent Garnier - "Man with the Red Face (Darren Emerson Remix)" – 7:21

References

External links

Global Underground
2001 compilation albums
DJ mix albums